The Hyundai e-Mighty (hangul:현대 이 마이티, 현대 e-마이티) is a line of light-duty commercial vehicles by Hyundai Motor Company. The range was primarily available in Korea and some other Asian countries. e-Mighty was first manufactured in October 2004 with the first cars going to Korea. Manufacturing began in 2004 with Hyundai in Korea and Asia. Other areas which imported or manufactured the e-Mighty included Europe, the Mid-east and North America. In many markets the e-Mighty was very expensive and was replaced by the Hyundai Truck when that model became available for worldwide markets in early 2004.

The overseas market was also important for the e-Mighty - to the extent that it was manufactured there from the 2000s using many local components.

Most models of the truck are distinguishable by a front 'e-Mighty' badge, but the common Hyundai badge is usually used on the rear.
Japanese and Asian competitors are the Mitsubishi Fuso Canter, Isuzu Elf, UD Atlas, Toyota Dyna, and Hino Dutro.

Models
Hyundai e-Mighty is a truck design by the Hyundai Motor Company Jeonju Design Center, rebadged in Bering MS, Manufacture period: 2004–present.

Model name (South Korea)
Gold
Super
Deluxe
HD78

Lineup
Other special vehicle models in Hyundai Special Vehicles
Standard Cab Low Long Cargo (2.5t)
Standard Cab Shot Cargo (2.5t, 3.5t Chassis Cab)
Standard Cab Long Cargo (2.5t, 3.5t)
Double Crew Cab Long Cargo (2.5t)
Standard Cab Shot Dump (2.5t, 3.5t)

External links
Hyundai e-Mighty Product Homepage (in Korean)
Hyundai e-Mighty Specifications (in Korean, PDF only)
Hyundai e-Mighty Optional List - 1st, 2nd (in Korean, PDF only)

Rear-wheel-drive vehicles
E-Mighty